Rio Grande Regional Airport , also known as Gustavo Cramer Airport is the airport serving Rio Grande, Brazil.

It is operated by DAP.

Airlines and destinations
No scheduled flights operate at this airport.

Access

See also

List of airports in Brazil

References

External links

Airports in Rio Grande do Sul